The 2000 Mnet Music Video Festival (MMF) was the second of the annual music awards in Seoul, South Korea that took place on November 24, 2000, at the Little Angels Arts Center.

Leading the nominees were boyband H.O.T. and solo artist Jo Sung-mo, with three each. By the end of the ceremony, Jo Sung-mo received the most awards with two wins, including the "Music Video of the Year" daesang award. The boy-band group H.O.T. received only one award, though they received the daesang award for "Best Popular Music Video".

Background
The award-giving body continued to be named as "M.net Korean Music Festival" (MKMF) for the second time. During this time, four more categories were added including the Best R&B Performance. The Best New Artist and Best Group were given to two recipients each since the awards for male and female recipients were separated. In addition, the Best Group branched out further to give a separate award for the Best Mixed Group. Furthermore, the event also featured Westlife, the first international artist to perform live. The grand awards (or daesang) were still the Best Popular Music Video and Music Video of the Year, without the nominees.

Nomination process
The Nominee Selection Committee had an initial screening to choose for the nominees who released songs or albums from November 1999 to October 2000. The official website was then opened on November 2 for voting. In addition, professional judges have also chosen from the nominees based on its criteria: planning, song quality, artistry, and popularity.

Winners and nominees
Winners are listed first and highlighted in boldface.

Special awards
 Best International Artist: Britney Spears – "Oops!... I Did It Again" 
 M.net Japan Viewer's Choice Award: Click-B ("화영문")
 Judges' Choice Award: Tae Jin-ah ("Love Is Not For Someone")

Multiple awards

Artist(s) with multiple wins
The following artist(s) received two or more wins (excluding the special awards):

Artist(s) with multiple nominations
The following artist(s) received two or more nominations:

Performers and presenters
The following individuals and groups, listed in order of appearance, presented awards or performed musical numbers.

Performers

Presenters

Notes

References

External links
 Mnet Asian Music Awards  official website

MAMA Awards ceremonies
Mnet Music Video Festival
Mnet Music Video Festival
Mnet Music Video Festival
Mnet Music Video Festival, 2000